Cryptogam Ridge is an east–west ridge lying south of Cummings Cove in Signy Island, South Orkney Islands. The north-facing slope of the ridge supports a diversity of lichens and mosses, collectively referred to as cryptogams (spore-producing plants). It was named by the UK Antarctic Place-Names Committee in 1991.

References
 

Ridges of the South Orkney Islands